In the European region, there are multiple stock exchanges among which five are considered major (as having a market cap of over US$1 trillion):
Euronext, which is a pan-European, Dutch-domiciled and France-headquartered stock exchange composed of seven market places in Belgium, France, Ireland, the Netherlands, Italy, Norway, and Portugal.
London Stock Exchange Group, which is a global stock exchange composed of the London Stock Exchange.
Deutsche Börse, which operates Europe's third largest stock exchange, the Frankfurt Stock Exchange/Xetra.
SIX Swiss Exchange, which operates Switzerland's major stock exchange.
Nasdaq Nordic, which is composed of Scandinavian and Baltic stock exchanges; including Sweden, Denmark, Finland, Iceland, Estonia, Latvia, and Lithuania, with activity in Norway and the Faroe Islands.

List

See also
Central banks and currencies of Europe
List of stock exchanges
European Central Bank
Federation of Euro-Asian Stock Exchanges

Notes

References

External links
Tirana Stock Exchange's World Stock Exchange list
Companies listed on the Frankfurt Stock Exchange Entry Standard segment
Companies listed on the Frankfurt Stock Exchange General Standard segment
Companies listed on the Frankfurt Stock Exchange Prime Standard segment

Lists of stock exchanges
Stock Exchanges